The Brazilian Woman's Party (PMB) is a right-wing political party in Brazil which uses the number 35. Known for its non-feminist and anti-abortion stance, the party is not represented in the National Congress.

The PMB was founded in 2015 by Sued Haidar, who doubled as the president of the party's National Committee. At its peak, the party was the tenth largest in Congress, represented by 21 federal deputies in the Chamber of Deputies, only two of which were women, and one representative in the Federal Senate, Senator Hélio José. In 2017, the party was condemned by the Superior Electoral Court of Minas Gerais for not having the minimum quota of women candidates. Most of the deputies have since left the party, and José switched his party affiliation to the Brazilian Democratic Movement Party in March 2016.

In January 2017, the PMB had 38,438 members. As of July 2018, this number has grown to 42,619.

On 2021, the party attempted to change its name to "Brasil 35", a modification made to attract the Brazilian president Jair Bolsonaro after he left his original Social Liberal Party and failed to create his own Alliance for Brazil, and mark the transition of the party to conservatism. However, on April 2022, the Superior Electoral Court refused the name change, on the basis that "the change of the party's name to “Brasil”, [...] would have intense potential to generate confusion or mislead the electorate."

Notable members

Electoral history

Legislative elections

See also 
:Category:Party of the Brazilian Woman politicians

References

External links
Brazilian Woman's Party website

Political parties established in 2015
2015 establishments in Brazil
Conservative parties in Brazil